Motshegetsi "Motsi" Mabuse (born 11 April 1981) is a South African-German dancer. She has appeared on Let's Dance, the German version of Strictly Come Dancing, originally appearing as a professional dancer but later became a judge on the show. On 22 July 2019, it was announced that Mabuse would replace Darcey Bussell as a judge on the 17th series of Strictly Come Dancing.

Biography
Mabuse was born in Mankwe in 1981 in what was then the Republic of Bophutatswana, whose independence was internationally unrecognised by any country other than South Africa. Bophuthatswana later became part of South Africa in 1994. 

Her family moved to Pretoria when she was five. Whilst in Pretoria, her sister Oti Mabuse was born, and they both took an interest in dancing. Motsi was educated at Hillview High School, Pretoria.

Dancing career
Mabuse was expected to become a lawyer and join the family law firm, but she became intrigued by dancing whilst studying at the University of Pretoria. Her education moved to dancing, and in 1998, she was the runner up in the national championships. The following year, she found her dance and romantic partner, Timo Kulczak at the British Open Championships in Blackpool. They married in 2003, and they competed in international dance competitions from their home in Germany. In 2013 she won the German Latin dance contest with the Ukrainian dancer Evgenij Voznyuk.

Media career

Let's Dance
Mabuse became known in Germany in 2007 through the second season of the RTL dance show Let's Dance, in which she danced with singer and former Eurovision Song Contest  participant Guildo Horn. The couple were eliminated in the fifth show, and finished in 6th place. In 2010, she danced in the third season on the show with Rolf Scheider, a former juror of Germany's Next Topmodel, and reached fifth place. In the first episode, they had already been eliminated, but returned after the voluntary retirement of Arthur Abraham. Since 2011, Mabuse has sat on the judging panel with Joachim Llambi and Jorge Gonzalez.

Further television and stage performances 
Mabuse was among the ARD broadcasting team for the 2010 FIFA World Cup and delivered background reports from South Africa. In 2011, she replaced Bruce Darnell on the jury of the fifth season of Das Supertalent. She was also a judge on the German version of Stepping Out in 2015.

In 2016, she made her debut as an actress at the 66th Bad Hersfelder Festspiele in The Crucible directed by Dieter Wedel. The same year she was a jury member of the RTL II plus-size model casting show Curvy Supermodel – Real. Nice. Curvy. In 2018, she became the presenter of the new styling show, Who Makes Me Beautiful on RTLplus.

Strictly Come Dancing 
Since series 17 in 2019, Mabuse has been a judge on BBC's Strictly Come Dancing replacing Darcey Bussell. Her sister, Oti, was a professional dancer on the show.

In 2021, Mabuse became an ambassador of Weight Watchers.

Personal life 
From 2003, she was married to her dancing partner, Timo Kulczak. The pair divorced after 11 years of marriage in 2014. 

In 2015, it was confirmed she was in a romantic relationship with her dance partner, Evgenij Voznyuk. She became Motsi Mabuse-Voznyuk in a small legal ceremony before celebrating with more guests in Mallorca in 2017, and had their daughter the following year. Between her television commitments, the couple run a dance school together in Germany, where Mabuse has been based for over 20 years.

Filmography

References

Further reading

External links

 

1981 births
Living people
People from Bojanala Platinum District Municipality
South African female dancers
South African emigrants to Germany
University of Pretoria alumni
RTL Group people
South African ballroom dancers